Jean Zinniker (born 26 April 1952) is a Swiss judoka. He competed in the men's heavyweight event at the 1980 Summer Olympics.

References

1952 births
Living people
Swiss male judoka
Olympic judoka of Switzerland
Judoka at the 1980 Summer Olympics
Place of birth missing (living people)